This article provides a grammar sketch of Basque grammar. Basque is the language of the Basque people of the Basque Country or Euskal Herria, which borders the Bay of Biscay in Western Europe.

Noun phrases
The Basque noun phrase is structured quite differently from those in most Indo-European languages.

Articles, determiners and quantifiers
Determiners and quantifiers play a central role in Basque noun phrase structure. Articles are best treated as a subset of the determiners.

Genitive and adjectival constructions

Adjectives

Number

Pronouns and adverbs

Personal pronouns
Personal pronouns differentiate three persons and two numbers. Zu must once have been the second-person plural pronoun but is now only the polite singular, having partially displaced the original second-person singular pronoun hi, now a markedly familiar form of address. Zuek represents a repluralised derivative of zu and is now the only second-person plural pronoun.

The function of third-person personal pronouns may be filled by any of the demonstrative pronouns or their emphatic counterparts in ber-.

Besides these ordinary personal pronouns, there are emphatic (or intensive) ones, whose forms vary considerably between dialects: the first-person singular is neu, nerau, neroni or nihaur.

Demonstrative pronouns
The demonstrative determiners (see above) may be used pronominally (as indeed can all the determiners except for the articles). There are also emphatic (intensive) demonstrative pronouns beginning with ber-.

It has often been noted that in traditional usage (but less so among modern speakers), there is often an explicit correlation between the three degrees of proximity in the demonstrative forms and the grammatical persons, such that hau is made to correspond to ni, hori to hi/zu and so on. One manifestation of this (others lie beyond the scope of this sketch) is the now old-fashioned mode of addressing persons in social positions commanding special respect (such as a priest, for example) using third-person verb forms and, for the personal pronoun, the second-degree intensive demonstrative  (see the above table).

Other pronouns and correlative adverbs

Further forms
 All the demonstrative pronouns and adverbs may be extended by the suffix -xe (-txe) which lends further emphasis:  (this very thing),  (exactly here),  (exactly in this way),  (right now).
 The pronouns can all be declined in any case (see below). The personal and demonstrative pronouns exhibit allomorphy between absolutive and non-zero cases. The adverbs can be adjectivalised by addition of -ko (-go), and some can also take other locative suffixes.
 There are two further series of indefinites, as illustrated by edonor, edonon... and nornahi, zernahi..., respectively; both series may be translated as 'whoever, wherever...' or 'anyone, anywhere...'.
 Negative pronouns and adverbs consist of the negative polarity series together with ez 'no' or as part of a negative sentence: inor ez 'nobody', Ez dut inor ezagutzen 'I don't know anybody' = 'I know nobody'.

Declension

Cases
Basque noun phrases are followed by a case suffix, which specifies the relation between the noun phrase and its clause (playing roughly the role of prepositions in English). The most basic cases are shown here, for convenience divided into three main groups: nuclear, local (or locative) and others.

Case suffixes are attached to whatever element (noun, adjective, determiner etc.) comes last in the noun phrase according to the rules already given. The different forms or "declensions" of each case suffix given in the following tables are selected in accordance with the nature of the nominal element to which the case ending is attached, as will be explained below.

Sets of case forms ("declensions")
The four sets of forms, labelled 1 to 4 in the preceding tables, have the following uses and characteristics:

From the above, it may be deduced that the essential formal characteristics of the Basque cases are as shown in the following table:

Declension of personal pronouns, demonstratives and bat, batzuk

For the most part, the application of the suffixes to any word in the language is highly regular. In this section are the main exceptions:

Personal pronouns and demonstratives display some irregularities in declension. The personal pronouns ni, hi, gu, zu form their possessive genitive by adding -re rather than -ren: nire, hire, gure, zure. They are the pronominal possessives:

As has been seen, the demonstratives each have three stems: one for the absolutive singular (hau, hori, hura), another for all other singular cases (hon-, horr-, har-), and one for the plural, all cases (haue-, horie-, haie-). In the plural, they take a -k suffix in the absolutive, as does batzuk 'some').

Animate local cases

As a rule, the local case suffixes given above are not used directly with noun phrases that refer to a person or an animal (called animate noun phrases). An inessive, allative or ablative relation affecting such noun phrases may be expressed by using the suffixes inessive -gan, allative -gana, and ablative -gandik, affixed to either the possessive genitive or the absolutive: nigan 'in me', irakaslearengana 'to(wards) the teacher' (irakasle 'teacher'), zaldiengandik 'from the horses' (zaldi 'horse'), haur horrengandik 'from that child', Koldorengana 'to(wards) Koldo'.

Compound case forms
In addition to the basic case forms given above, further forms are found derived from them through the addition of further suffixes or extensions. Some of the additional forms provide for the expression of more nuanced relations; others have the same or similar meanings to the basic forms, with which they merely contrast stylistically or dialectally:

Adjectival -ko
The -ko suffix (see above) may be added to some case forms to make their syntactic function adjectival.

Any such adjectivalised forms may be used without an overt head noun, then likely to appear with a suffixed article:

Such nominalised adjectival forms may further take case suffixes of their own:

While the potential to generate and understand (in a reasonable context) such complex forms is built into Basque grammar and perfectly intelligible to speakers, in practice, the use of such very complex constructions is not uncommon.

Local cases with adverbs
The fourth set is local case suffixes (etymologically the primary forms) incorporated into the place adverbs, which gives these following (partly irregular) forms:

Many other adverbs may be adjectivalised with -ko. Some may take certain other case suffixes (usually from set 4), particularly ablative -tik/-dik:  'since yesterday',  'from far away'.

Postpositions
Basque postpositions are items of sufficient lexical substance and grammatical autonomy to be treated as separate words (unlike the case suffixes) and specifying relations. They are so called because they follow the word or phrase whose relation they express (compare prepositions, which precede a word or phrase, but do not exist in Basque).

The most typical Basque postpositions are built on nominal structures: -aren gainean 'on top of' centres on the word gain 'top', but not all postpositional nuclei consist of nouns that can be used independently of the postpositional construction in which they participate.

One subset of postpositions that express spatial relationships (again exemplified by gainean) have a lexical stem whose syntactic behaviour is roughly noun-like but is limited to a much narrower range of possible patterns (in the grammars of some non-European languages such elements are called relational nouns or relationals). Here are some Basque relationals:

There are a few relationals, such as kanpo- 'outside', goi- 'up' and behe- 'down', that cannot be preceded by a complement of the kind described but have an adverbial uses resembling them: Kanpora noa 'I'm going outside', Goian dago 'It is above', etc. The irregular allative of goi is gora 'up(wards)'.

Comparison
In English, the comparative and superlative of many adjectives and adverbs are formed by adding the suffixes -er and -est respectively (from big, for example, bigger and biggest are formed). Basque adjectives and adverbs similarly take such suffixes, but there are three morphologically derived degrees of comparison. From handi 'big' is handiago 'bigger', handien(a) '(the) biggest' (where -a is the article) and handiegi 'too big':

Comparative, superlative and excessive adjectives may be used in the same syntactic frames as adjectives in the positive (basic) degree: compare  'high mountains' [mountain high.PLURAL.ART] and mendi altuagoak 'higher mountains' [mountain higher.PLURAL.ART]. The noun preceding a superlative often takes the partitive suffix -(r)ik, either  or  'the highest mountains' is possible.

Occasionally, such suffixes may be added to other word forms: from gora 'up' (irregular allative of the relational goi-, hence literally 'to above') can be formed gorago (for gora + -ago), 'more up', i.e. 'higher'. Just as English has a few irregular forms of comparison such as better and best (from good or well), so does Basque: on 'good' but hobe 'better'. Other ways of comparing quality or manner, in both Basque and English, involve using a separate word, such as hain handi 'so big'.

Special words are used to compare quantities (how much or how many of something), such as  'more',  '(the) most',  'too much, too many'. They follow the noun quantified:  'more books',  'too much salt', and  'so much, so many', which precedes the noun:  'so much money'. All of them can also be used adverbially (comparing the extent to which something occurs or is the case):  'Don't think so much!'.

Comparisons may involve reference to a standard (of comparison): compare English is easier (no standard mentioned) to English is easier than Basque (there, Basque is referred to as the standard of comparison). English puts the word than in front of the standard. In Fish is as expensive as meat, meat is the standard, indicated by the second as (compare Fish is as expensive or Fish is so expensive, where no standard is mentioned). Comparisons of the as...as type are called equative. With superlatives, as in Donostia is the prettiest city in the Basque Country, on the other hand, the Basque Country is not really a standard but a domain or range within which the superlative applies. The structures used in such comparisons in Basque are as follows (the second table shows examples); the word orders shown are the most common and considered basic, but certain variations are also possible.

Verbs

Although several verbal categories are expressed morphologically, periphrastic tense formations predominate. Up to three arguments (subject, direct object and indirect object) can be indexed morphologically on single verb forms, and further sets of synthetic allocutive forms make for an even more complex morphology. The verb is also an area of the language subject to a fair amount of dialectal variation. Due to the complexity of this subject and its traditional centrality in descriptions of Basque grammar, it is the subject of a separate article.

Syntax

Information structure

The focus rule and the topic rule

Basque word order is largely determined by the notions of focus and topic which are employed to decide how to "package" or structure the propositional content (information) in utterances. Focus is a feature that attaches to a part of a sentence considered to contain the most important information, the "point" of the utterance. Thus in different discourse contexts, the focus of the same (basic) sentence can be on different parts, giving rise (in a language like Basque) to different grammatical forms. Topic, on the other hand, refers to a part of a sentence that serves to put the information it contains into context, i.e. to establish "what we are talking about". Basque word order involves in a very basic way two rules, the "focus rule" and the "topic rule", as follows:

 Focus rule: Whichever constituent of a sentence is in focus immediately precedes the verb.
 Topic rule: A topic is emphasised by placing it at the beginning of the sentence.

Compare, for example:

Basque is sometimes called an SOV (i.e. subject–object–verb) language, but as one can see, the order of elements in the Basque sentence is not rigidly determined by grammatical roles (such as subject and object) and has to do with other criteria (such as focus and topic). In Basque the SOV is more common and less marked than the OSV order, although each is appropriate in different contexts (as are other word orders). That is to say, it is more common and less marked (other things being equal) for the subject to be topic and for the object to be in focus than vice versa. This may be explained by intrinsic qualities of the concepts "subject" and "object". It is compatible with the cross-linguistic tendency for topichood to be a characteristic feature of prototypical subjects, for example.

Verbal focus

A possibility seemingly not taken into account by the above focus rule, which states that the focused element precedes the verb, is the circumstance wherein the verb itself is in focus. One situation in which this occurs is a clause with no (or no focused) non-verbal constituents, only perhaps a topic-subject, as in 'He knows' or 'John is coming' (in contexts where 'he' or 'John' are not focused). Of course there may be other constituents, as long as none of them are focused, e.g. 'She has money' (where the point of the utterance is not to tell us what she has, but whether or not she has it). This type of sentence is sometimes described as one in which what is in focus is not so much the verb as the affirmation of the predicate; i.e. 'She has money' does not really stand in contrast to, say, 'She eats money', but only to 'She doesn't have money'. For the present practical purpose this distinction may be ignored and the term "verbal focus" will be applied to such cases.

The most notable verb-focusing strategy in Basque grammar is use of the affirmative prefix ba-. Attached to a synthetically conjugated finite verb, this has the effect of putting that verb (or its affirmation, if one prefers) in focus, thereby implying that whatever (if anything) precedes the verb is not in focus. Thus the use of ba- looks as if it blocks application of the general focus rule which assigns focus to an element in pre-verbal position.

The affirmative use of ba- (not to confused with the homophonous subordinating prefix meaning 'if') is normally used with synthetic finite forms, thus also  or Badator John 'John is coming' (as opposed to   'John is coming'), Badu dirua (or in western Basque Badauka dirua) 'She has money'. In most varieties of Basque, however, affirmative ba- is not so common with compound tenses or compound verbs.

To place a compound verb form (or its affirmation) in focus, it may be enough to place the main sentence stress (which normally goes on the focused item) on the first component of the verbal compound expression. Here it seems that the auxiliary part of the expression is treated as representing the "verb" in the general focus rule, thereby predictably throwing the focus onto the preceding component, which is now the main verb. In western dialects an alternative procedure used to emphasise the placement of focus on the verb is to make this a complement of the verb egin 'do'.

Further observations on focus and topic
There are certain exceptions to the general focus rule:

Systematic exceptions apart, focus assignment (as defined in the preceding sections) is an obligatory feature of Basque clauses. Because it is obligatory and automatic, such focus assignment need not be pragmatically marked and does not necessarily signify emphatic focusing or foregrounding. This observation is particularly applicable when focus is assigned in accordance with predictable or prototypical patterns, such as when the direct object takes the focus position in a transitive clause, or when the verb is formally focused in an intransitive clause.

In some varieties or styles of Basque, e.g. in poetic diction, one may achieve more emphatic focus (even on an object) by inverting the usual verb-auxiliary order:  In ordinary colloquial usage many speakers do not allow this, but some allow other such "inversions", e.g. with compound verbs (light-verb constructions), e.g. normal Irakaslearekin hitz egingo dut 'I'll speak to the teacher' (ordinary focus on irakaslearekin) versus more marked Irakaslearekin egingo dut hitz (emphatic focus on irakaslearekin).

A topic may be backgrounded (although arguably still remaining a topic) by placement at the end of a sentence rather than at the beginning, e.g. , roughly 'They eat bones, dogs'; so also  'I don't know', where  is no doubt a topic of sorts since if it weren't there would be no need to mention it at all.

Clause-initial verbs

Although the following restrictions on the placement of verbs within the clause are the outcome of the various rules already given, it may be useful to summarise those restrictions here.

Negation

Questions

There are two question markers: al for straightforward yes-no questions, and ote for tentative questions of any kind (yes-no or not). Both al and ote are placed immediately in front of the finite verb form. The question marker al is not used pan-dialectally. In some dialects the same function is performed by a suffix -a attached to the finite verb form (thus the equivalents of the above examples are John ikusi duzu(i)a? and Badakia?). Still other dialects lack either interrogative al or interrogative -a.

Word order in wh-questions (i.e. those with question words) is fully accounted for by the general rules of Basque word order, granted a further rule for Basque (shared by many other languages) which states that interrogative words and phrases (e.g. nor 'who?',  'in which white house?',  'how much money?', etc.) are obligatorily focused.

Bibliography

 Agirre Berezibar, J.M. (1991). Euskal gramatika deskriptiboa. Bilbao: Labayru Ikastegia. (in Basque)
 Allières, Jacques (1979). Manuel pratique de basque. Paris: Picard. (in French)
 Altube, S. (1929/1975). Erderismos. Bilbao. (in Spanish)
 Azkue, R.M. (1905/1969). Morfología vasca. Bilbao: La Gran Enciclopedia Vasca. (in Spanish)
 Campión, Arturo (1884). Gramática de los cuatro dialectos literarios de la lengua euskara. Bilbao: La Gran Enciclopedia Vasca. (in Spanish)
 Goenaga, Patxi (1980). Gramatika bideetan (second edition). Donostia: Erein. (in Basque)
 Hualde, José Ignacio & Ortiz de Urbina, Jon, eds. (2003). A grammar of Basque. Berlin: Mouton de Gruyter, 2003. .
 King, Alan R. (1994). The Basque language: A practical introduction. University of Nevada Press. .
 King, Alan R. & Olaizola Elordi, Begotxu (1996). Colloquial Basque: A complete language course. London and New York: Routledge. .
 Lafitte, Pierre (1944/1979). Grammaire basque : navarro-labourdin littéraire. Donostia: Elkar. (in French)
 
 Saltarelli, M. (1988). Basque. London: Croom Helm.
 Trask, R, Larry (1996). The history of Basque. London and New York: Routledge. .

INSTR:instrumental